Sabash Thambi is a 1967 Indian Tamil-language spy thriller film, directed by C. P. Jambulingam and produced by K. R. Balan. Music was by S. M. Subbaiah Naidu. The film stars Jaishankar and L. Vijayalakshmi. It was released on 10 February 1967.

Plot 

Ramesh (S. A. Ashokan) dies in an accident and he is suspected to have committed suicide by every one. But Sekar (Jaishankar) claims it to be a murder and he is on a mission to find out the culprits using his wits and instinct. He gets behind the mystery of Ramesh's death and solves the case. James Bond (Nagesh) was a performance like a comedian, finally they know he is a CID officer assigned the Ramesh murder case.

Cast 
 Jaishankar as Sekhar
 L. Vijayalakshmi as Shanthi
 S. A. Ashokan as Ramesh
 Rathna as Ratna
 Nagesh as JB
 Thengai Srinivasan as Muthu
 Pandari Bai as Sarada
 O. A. K. Thevar as Jagadish
 Master Rajkumar as Babu
 M. R. R. Vasu as Vasu
 Suryakala as JB's assistant

Soundtrack 
Music was composed by S. M. Subbaiah Naidu and lyrics were written by Vaali.

Reception 
Kalki noted that the film did not have enough scope for Jaishankar to show his heroism and called the story old-fashioned, but appreciated Rajkumar's performance.

References

Bibliography

External links 
 

1960s spy thriller films
1960s Tamil-language films
1967 films
Indian black-and-white films
Indian spy thriller films